Hyrrokkin  or Saturn XLIV is a natural satellite of Saturn. Its discovery was announced by Scott S. Sheppard, David C. Jewitt, Jan Kleyna, and Brian G. Marsden on June 26, 2006, from observations taken between December 12, 2004, and April 30, 2006.

Hyrrokkin is about 8 kilometres in diameter, and orbits Saturn at an average distance of 18,168 Mm in 914 days, at an inclination of 153° to the ecliptic (154° to Saturn's equator), in a retrograde direction and with an eccentricity of 0.3582. During four observations in March 2013, the synodic rotational period was measured by the Cassini spacecraft to approximately 12 hours and 45 minutes. The rotation period was later refined to  hours. Its light curve shows three minima as seen in Ymir and Siarnaq, but has one minimum much shallower than the others. The rotation period and orbit are similar to Greip's, with only the  inclination being appreciably different, but it is not known whether the moons are closely related to each other.

It was named in April 2007 after Hyrrokkin, a giantess from Norse mythology, who launched Hringhorni, Baldr's funeral ship. It was originally listed as being spelled Hyrokkin, but the spelling was later corrected.

References

External links
 Scott Sheppard's Saturnian satellites page
 IAUC 8727: Satellites of Saturn June 30, 2006 (discovery)
 MPEC 2006-M44: S/2004 S 19 June 26, 2006 (discovery and ephemeris)
 IAUC 8826: Satellites of Jupiter and Saturn April 5, 2007 (Naming the moon)
 IAUC 8860: Saturn XLIV (Hyrrokkin) July 31, 2007 (correcting the name)
 Denk, T., Mottola, S. (2013): Irregular Saturnian Moon Lightcurves from Cassini-ISS Observations: Update. Abstract 406.08, DPS conference 2013, Denver (Colorado), October 10, 2013 (synodic rotation period)

Moons of Saturn
Norse group
Irregular satellites
Discoveries by Scott S. Sheppard
Astronomical objects discovered in 2006
Moons with a retrograde orbit